Carlo De Angelis (born 12 March 1947) is an Italian football manager. He managed Chievoverona for many years in Serie C2 and Serie C1.

Career
1976-1978  Chievo (Youths)
1978-1980  Chievo
1980-1983  Verona (Youths)
1983-1984  Pescantina
1984-1985  Benacense
1985-1987  Chievo
1987-1988  Chievo (Youths)
1988-1989  Rieti
1989-1991  Chievo (Youths)
1991-1993  Chievo

References

Living people
Italian football managers
1947 births